Room for Two is an Australian television series which aired on Sydney station ATN-7 during 1958-1959. Hosted by Ray Taylor, it was an hour-long variety program, and a spin-off from Sydney Tonight. An episode aired 11 December 1958 was the first Australian TV episode to feature songs from the hit musical My Fair Lady. Like many ATN series of the era, the series featured the ATN Orchestra, conducted by Thomas Tycho.

References

External links

1958 Australian television series debuts
1959 Australian television series endings
Black-and-white Australian television shows
English-language television shows
Australian variety television shows